Pieter Jansz (c.1612, Amsterdam – 1672, Amsterdam), was a Dutch Golden Age painter.

Biography
According to Houbraken he was a good draughtsman who learned to paint from the Haarlem glass painter Jan Philipsz van Bouckhorst, whose works can still be seen in many Dutch churches. Both he and his teacher died in the rampjaar 1672. Jansz's own pupil was Jan Pietersz Zomer.

According to the RKD he painted, sculpted and made designs for book illustrations.

References

Pieter Jansz on Artnet

1612 births
1672 deaths
Dutch Golden Age painters
Dutch male painters
Painters from Amsterdam